Robert Lewis Rodgers (June 2, 1875 – May 9, 1960) was a Republican member of the U.S. House of Representatives from Pennsylvania.

Rodgers was born in El Dorado, Kansas. He was raised on a farm near Jamestown, Pennsylvania. During the war with Spain, he enlisted in Company K, Fifteenth Regiment of the Pennsylvania Volunteer Infantry. After his return from service he taught in the district schools and engaged in agricultural pursuits. He moved to Erie, Pennsylvania, in 1914 and engaged in the insurance, real estate, and mortgage business.

Rodgers was elected as a Republican to the Seventy-sixth and to the three succeeding Congresses.  He was an unsuccessful candidate for renomination in 1946.

References
 Retrieved on 2008-02-11
The Political Graveyard

External links

1875 births
1960 deaths
People from El Dorado, Kansas
Republican Party members of the United States House of Representatives from Pennsylvania
American military personnel of the Spanish–American War
Politicians from Erie, Pennsylvania
Military personnel from Pennsylvania
Businesspeople from Pennsylvania
Farmers from Pennsylvania
Educators from Pennsylvania